Glossiphonia is a genus of Glossiphoniidae.

The genus was described in 1816 by James Rawlins Johnson.

It has cosmopolitan distribution.

Species:
 Glossiphonia complanata (Linnaeus, 1758)
 Glossiphonia concolor (Aphathy, 1888)
 Glossiphonia heteroclita (Linnaeus, 1761)
 Glossiphonia lata Oka, 1910
 Glossiphonia smaragdina Oka, 1910
 Glossiphonia verrucata (Müller, 1844)

References

Leeches